Pestovsky (masculine), Pestovskaya (feminine), or Pestovskoye (neuter) is the name of several rural localities in Russia:
Pestovsky (rural locality), a settlement in Kondukovskaya Rural Administration of Uzlovsky District of Tula Oblast
Pestovskaya, Kirov Oblast, a village in Griboshinsky Rural Okrug of Luzsky District of Kirov Oblast
Pestovskaya, Moscow Oblast, a village in Dmitrovskoye Rural Settlement of Shatursky District of Moscow Oblast